The Bible has been translated into many languages from the biblical languages of Aramaic, Greek, and Hebrew. The Latin Vulgate translation was dominant in Western Christianity through the Middle Ages. Since then, the Bible has been translated into many more languages. English Bible translations also have a rich and varied history of more than a millennium.

Included when possible are dates and the source language(s) and, for incomplete translations, what portion of the text has been translated.  Certain terms that occur in many entries are linked at the bottom of the page.

Because various biblical canons are not identical, the "incomplete translations" section includes only translations seen by their translators as incomplete, such as Christian translations of the New Testament alone.  Translations comprising only part of certain canons are considered "complete" if they comprise the translators' complete canon, e.g. Jewish versions of the Tanakh.

Early incomplete Bibles

Partial Bibles

Complete Bibles

Modern Aramaic to English translations 
Translations from Syriac to English include:

 Translation of the Four Gospels from the Peschito, based on the eastern text, J. W. Etheridge (1846)
 John Wesley Etheridge's translation of the entire New Testament appears in The Etheridge New Testament (2013) compiled by Bruce A. Klein (has Etheridge's bracketed comments), and also in Etheridge Translation of the Aramaic Peshitta New Testament (2016) compiled by Ewan MacLeod
 Murdock Translation of the Aramaic Peshitta New Testament (2015) compiled by Ewan MacLeod
 The Syriac New Testament, based on the western text, James Murdock (1851)
 The New Testament According to the Eastern Text. Translated from Original Aramaic Sources. Philadelphia: A.J. Holman, 1940, based on the eastern text, George Lamsa
 The Peshitta Holy Bible Translated (2019) by David Bauscher
 The Original Aramaic New Testament in Plain English with Psalms & Proverbs (8th edition with notes) (2013) by David Bauscher
 Aramaic Peshitta New Testament Translation by Janet M. Magiera
 The Messianic Aleph Tav Interlinear Scriptures: Volume Four Gospels (2016) and Messianic Aleph Tav Interlinear Scriptures: Volume Five Acts-Revelation by William H. Sanford (interlinear Aramaic + Etheridge translation; interlinear Greek + English translation)
 The Aramaic Gospels and Acts:  Text and Translation (2003) by Joseph Pashka
 A Translation, in English Daily Used, of the Peshito-Syriac Text, and of the Received Greek Text, of Hebrews, James, 1 Peter, and 1 John (1889) and A Translation, In English Daily Used, of the Seventeen Letters Forming Part of the Peshito-Syriac Books (1890) by William Norton
 The Testimony of Yeshua (2013) by Lonnie Martin is a reworked Etheridge and Murdock rendition of the New Testament
 The Message of Matthew:  An Annotated Parallel Aramaic-English Gospel of Matthew (1991) by Rocco A. Errico
 Crawford Codex of Revelation: Aramaic Interlinear with English Translation (2016) by Greg Glaser
 Gorgias Press's The Antioch Bible series contains the Peshitta New Testament with English translation, plus many Peshitta Old Testament books
 Lapid Jewish Aramaic New Testament by Christopher Fredrickson and Lapid Publications is a translation from the Khabouris Codex, Yonan Codex and Houghton 1199 Codex.  It also includes 560 transliterations and definitions of key Aramaic words and phrases within the text. (2010)

This list does not include adaptations of such as the Hebraic Roots Version by James Trimm (2001) which are adaptations from the JPS New Testament (translated directly from Greek into Hebrew), not the Peshitta.

See also

 Jane Aitken, first woman in the United States to print an English version of the Bible
 Bible glosses
 Byzantine text-type
 Catholic Bibles
 English translations of the Bible
 Gospel
 Middle English Bible translations
 Miscellaneous English Bible translations
 Modern English Bible translations
 Nestle-Aland Text
 Pentateuch
 Peshitta
 Psalms
 Psalter
 Septuagint
 Textus Receptus
 Trilingual heresy
 Vulgate

References

 Catalogue of English Bible Translations; A Classified Bibliography of Versions and Editions Including Books, Parts, and Old and New Testament Apocrypha and Apocryphal Books. William J. Chamberlin. Westport, Connecticut: Greenwood Press, 1991.

Further reading
 Wills, Garry, "A Wild and Indecent Book" (review of David Bentley Hart, The New Testament:  A Translation, Yale University Press, 577 pp.), The New York Review of Books, vol. LXV, no. 2 (8 February 2018), pp. 34–35.  Discusses some pitfalls in interpreting and translating the New Testament.

External links
Bibelarchiv Vegelahn: English Bible translations, illustrated list with historical details and extracts from the publishers' Forewords 
List of English Bible Versions, Translations, and Paraphrases – a very extensive list by Steven DeRose, with detailed information and links to online sources
 Dukhrana.com — site contains the transcription of the Khaboris Codex plus Etheridge, Murdock, Lamsa, Younan's interlinear translation of Matthew – Acts 16, translations into Dutch and Afrikaans, and an interlinear study tool.
 Lamsa – OT and Lamsa – NT — Lamsa's translation of the Peshitta's Old Testament and New Testament
 aramaicdb.lightofword.org — site contains Magiera and Murdock, and an interlinear study tool

 
English
Lists of books about religion